This Can't Be Love is a 1994 American made-for-television romantic comedy film directed by Anthony Harvey and starring Katharine Hepburn and Anthony Quinn which premiered on CBS on March 13, 1994.

Plot
Hepburn and Quinn star as two aging actors who had a brief but intense marriage in the 1940s, and are reunited decades later to find that issues between them are not resolved. The film makes references to Hepburn's real career and personality, for instance starring in a Western with John Wayne. Hepburn was 86 and Quinn was 78 when they made the film. Supporting parts are played by Jason Bateman and Jami Gertz.

Cast
Katharine Hepburn as Marion Bennett
Anthony Quinn as Michael Reyman
Jason Bateman as Grant
Jami Gertz as Sarah

External links

1994 television films
1994 films
1994 romantic comedy films
American romantic comedy films
CBS network films
Films directed by Anthony Harvey
1990s American films